Artamonovo is a rural locality (a village) in Yusvinskoye Rural Settlement, Yusvinsky District, Perm Krai, Russia. The population was 19 as of 2010. There are 2 streets.

Geography 
Artamonovo is located 5 km east of Yusva (the district's administrative centre) by road. Spirino is the nearest rural locality.

References 

Rural localities in Yusvinsky District